William Fernie (7 May 1855 – 24 June 1924) was a Scottish professional golfer and golf course architect from St Andrews. He won the 1883 Open Championship at Musselburgh Links. The tournament was scheduled to last four rounds of the nine-hole course on a Friday in November. Fernie tied with defending champion Bob Ferguson, with both men shooting 158. The following day Fernie won a playoff by a single stroke.

Early life
Fernie was born in St Andrews, Scotland, on 7 May 1855.

Golf career
Fernie was runner-up in the Open Championship in 1882, 1884, 1890 and 1891. When George Strath left Royal Troon in 1887, Fernie took over as club professional and served for 37 years only retiring in January 1924, a few months before his death. As a golf course designer he made alterations to the Old Course at St Andrews and Royal Troon, and designed Turnberry's Ailsa, Felixstowe Ferry Golf Club and Isle of Arran courses. He also designed Appleby Golf Club in 1903, and Dumfries and County Golf Club in 1912.

Family
Two of his sons, Tom and Harry withdrew from 1924 Open qualifying at Royal Liverpool Golf Club because of their father's illness. Tom Fernie had finished fifth in the 1923 Open at Troon.

Death and legacy
Fernie died in Glasgow, Scotland, on 24 June 1924. He is best remembered for winning the 1883 Open Championship and finishing second four times.

Golf courses (original design)
Craigie Hill GC
Drumpellier Golf Club
Dumfries and County Golf Club
Dumfries and Galloway Golf Club
Elderslie Golf Club
Erskine Golf Club
Felixstowe Ferry Golf Club
Gatehouse of Fleet Golf Club
Greenock Whinhill Golf Club
Lamlash Golf Club
Machrie Bay Golf Club
New Cumnock Golf Club
Pitlochry Golf Club
Ralston Golf Club
Royal Troon (Portland Course)
Sanquhar Golf Club
Seacroft Golf Club
Shiskine Golf Club
Southerndown Golf Club
Stirling Golf Club
Strathaven Golf Club
Strathendrick Golf Club
Thornhill Golf Club
Turnberry (Ailsa)
Turnberry (Arran)
Whitecraigs Golf Club
Whitsand Bay GC

Golf Courses (Renovation)
Royal Troon (Old)
St. Andrews (Old)

Major championships

Wins (1)

1In a 36-hole playoff, Fernie defeated Ferguson by 1 stroke.

Results timeline

Note: Fernie played only in The Open Championship.
DNP = Did not play
CUT = missed the half-way cut
"T" indicates a tie for a place
Green background for wins. Yellow background for top-10

Team appearances
England–Scotland Professional Match (representing Scotland): 1903 (winners), 1904 (tie)

References

External links

opengolf.com report on the 1883 Open Championship
Shiskine Golf and Tennis Club History, including notes on Willie Fernie
Royal Troon, Club professionals, note on Willie Fernie
 Antique Golf Clubs from Scotland, makers

Scottish male golfers
Winners of men's major golf championships
Golf course architects
Golfers from St Andrews
1855 births
1924 deaths